The timeline of Chinese mythology starts with P'an-Ku and ends with Yu the Great, spanning from 36,000 years before the creation of the Earth to circa 2000 BC (time of Yu's rule, when he managed to overcome the Epic Flood). Some other myths were added outside this initial timespan, such as the myths from the Baxian, or the Eight Immortals (most of them are said to be born in the Tang or Song Dynasty).

Timeline

Chinese mythology